Bandiin Altangerel (born 28 August 1964) is a Mongolian boxer. He competed in the men's middleweight event at the 1992 Summer Olympics.

References

External links
 

1964 births
Living people
Mongolian male boxers
Olympic boxers of Mongolia
Boxers at the 1992 Summer Olympics
Place of birth missing (living people)
Boxers at the 1990 Asian Games
Asian Games silver medalists for Mongolia
Asian Games medalists in boxing
Medalists at the 1990 Asian Games
Middleweight boxers
20th-century Mongolian people
21st-century Mongolian people